NoCGV Ålesund was a purpose-built, leased, offshore patrol vessel for the Norwegian Coast Guard of the Royal Norwegian Navy.

Ålesund is named after the city Ålesund in Western Norway. She is a 1,350-ton vessel, and was armed with a Bofors 40 mm gun and Colt 12,7mm heavy machine guns. Ålesund was used for general EEZ patrol, including fishery inspection and search and rescue. She was based at the naval base Haakonsvern in Bergen. Her crew contained 10 officers and 12 conscripts.

She is currently disarmed and laid up in Herøy by owners. No plans for future use is known.

References

External links

Patrol vessels of the Norwegian Coast Guard